Trigonobalanus doichangensis is a species of tree in the family Fagaceae that can reach  in height. It is only found at few sites in Yunnan in China and at one site in Chiang Rai in Thailand. It is threatened by habitat loss and degradation. In China it is under second-class national protection.

References

Fagaceae
Trees of Thailand
Trees of China
Data deficient plants
Flora of Yunnan
Taxonomy articles created by Polbot
Taxa named by Aimée Antoinette Camus